The Baxter Theatre Centre is a performing arts complex in Rondebosch, a suburb of Cape Town, South Africa. The Baxter, as it is often known, is part of the University of Cape Town; it is also the second largest performing arts complex in Cape Town, after the Artscape Theatre Centre.

History
The Baxter opened on 1 August 1977. It was named after former Mayor of Cape Town William Duncan Baxter, who left money to the University of Cape Town specifically for the construction of a theatre centre. As well as improving the facilities available to the university's Drama Department, the Baxter also provided an alternative to the government-run Nico Malan Theatre Centre (now the Artscape Theatre Centre) for the staging of large productions. This was particularly important before the end of apartheid; while the Nationalist government could prevent the Nico Malan from staging productions that challenged its views, they could not exert the same degree of control over the Baxter, which was protected by the university's academic freedom.

Venues and programme
The Baxter has three venues:
the 665-seat Main Theatre
the 638-seat Concert Hall, with a Von Beckerath organ
the 172-seat Golden Arrow Studio

The Baxter Theatre conducts workshops aimed at the youth and at benefitting previously disadvantaged communities. The Zabalaza Outreach program works towards developing community skills and hosts the annual Baxter Zabalaza Theatre Festival which is a platform for previously disadvantaged theatre talent.

See also
 List of concert halls
 University of Cape Town

Notes

External links
 Baxter Theatre Centre website

Cape Town culture
University of Cape Town
Theatres in South Africa
Concert halls in South Africa
Theatres completed in 1977
Tourist attractions in Cape Town
Rondebosch